H2LO is the third studio album by Ukrainian singer Loboda, released on 24 March 2017 by Sony Music.

Critical reception 

InterMedia reviewer Alexey Mazhaeyv noted that "almost every song on H2LO could become a hit single."

Awards 
Songs from the album were popular on radio stations in Russia, Ukraine and in the CIS countries, and also received various awards. The album itself was recognized as Album of the Year at the Realnaya Premiya Music Box Awards, BraVo Awards and YUNA Awards. The album received its first Platinum certification in Russia after only a week after release. In November H2LO received the third Platinum certification.

Track listing

Charts

Certifications

References

External links
 
 
 
 
 

2017 albums
Sony Music albums
Svetlana Loboda albums
Russian-language albums